Boophis miniatus is a species of frog in the family Mantellidae.
It is endemic to Madagascar.
Its natural habitats are subtropical or tropical moist lowland forests, rivers, and heavily degraded former forest.
It is threatened by habitat loss.

References

miniatus
Endemic frogs of Madagascar
Amphibians described in 1902
Taxonomy articles created by Polbot